AFY may refer to:

 Adventure for Youth
 Afyon Airport, IATA code
 Afy Fletcher, cricketer on the West Indies women's cricket team
 Aphrodite ('Afy') Hallijohn, fictional character in the novel East Lynne, by Ellen Wood, the 1913 film East Lynne, and other adaptations of the story
 A vehicle model of Österreichische Automobil-Fabrik, an Austrian car and truck manufacturer

See also
 AF (disambiguation)
 Affy